Turbonilla luandensis is a species of sea snail, a marine gastropod mollusk in the family Pyramidellidae, the pyrams and their allies.

Distribution
This species occurs in the Atlantic Ocean off Angola.

References

External links
 To World Register of Marine Species

Endemic fauna of Angola
luandensis
Gastropods described in 1997